María Sonia Furió Flores (30 July 1937 – 1 December 1996) was a Spanish-born Mexican actress.

Early life
Furió was born in Alicante, the daughter of Nicolás Furió Cabanés and María Flores Guillén. She was very young when her family emigrated to Mexico because of the Spanish Civil War. She became a naturalized Mexican citizen on 2 May 1952 at age 14.

Career
Furió's debut was in the film Y mañana serán mujeres (1955). She studied modern and folkloric dance, English, French, painting, and sculpture. She completed her studies in stagecraft at the Academia de Andrés Soler. She won a golden medal from the Asociación Israelita for her role in the film Los desarraigados (1960). For her work in La cárcel de Cananea (1960), she received a trophy from the Asociación de Críticos Mexicanos.

Filmography
Se los chupó la bruja (1958)
Vacations in Acapulco (1961)
El tuerto Angustias (1974)

References

External links

1937 births
1996 deaths
Mexican film actresses
Mexican television actresses
Mexican stage actresses
Spanish emigrants to Mexico
People from Alicante
20th-century Mexican actresses